Cástulo Guerra (born August 24, 1945) is an Argentine actor who has appeared in several American films and television shows.

He has appeared in the films The Usual Suspects (1995), The Mexican (2001) and The Purge: Anarchy (2014).

Early life
At the Teatro Universitario de Tucumán, he was cast in the role of The Player in a production of Rosencrantz and Guildenstern Are Dead, which traveled to the Teatro Cervantes in Buenos Aires in 1971.

Career
Film roles include Terminator 2: Judgment Day, Cold Heaven, The Usual Suspects, Meet Me in Miami, Where the River Runs Black, The Mexican, The Celestine Prophecy, and Beverly Hills Chihuahua 2. His TV credits include: Riptide, The Fall Guy, Falcon Crest, The A-Team, Remington Steele, L.A. Law, Star Trek: The Next Generation, 21 Jump Street, Lois and Clark: The New Adventures of Superman, Brimstone, Nash Bridges, The Agency, ER, Alias, CSI: Miami, The West Wing, Prison Break and Numbers. He is also Samir Duran in StarCraft and Raphael Castillo in Santa Barbara.

He has provided the voice of General Suarez in the animated television series Deathstroke: Knights & Dragons.

Personal life
On December 15, 1972, he married production manager Christy Claire Risska. They have two children, Charity and Ian.

Filmography

Film

Two of a Kind (1983) as Gonzales
Stick (1985) as Nestor
Just Between Friends (1986) as Sportscaster
A Fine Mess (1986) as Italian Director
Where the River Runs Black (1986) as Orlando Santos
Nuts (1987) as Dr. Arantes
Sunset (1988) as Pancho
Cold Heaven (1991) as Dr. DeMencos
Runnioman (1998) as Father Talou
No Salida (1998) as Papi
Blink of an Eye (1999) as Father Chavez
Moonbeams (2001) as Dr. West

Television

Web series

Video games

References

External links

1945 births
Argentine male film actors
Argentine male television actors
Argentine male voice actors
Living people
Male actors from Córdoba, Argentina
20th-century Argentine male actors
21st-century Argentine male actors
Argentine emigrants to the United States